The SNCF 241.P is a 4-8-2 'Mountain' type express passenger steam locomotive that ran on the Société Nationale des Chemins de fer Français, (French National Railways) from 1948 until 1973. Introduced as large scale electrification of the SNCF was already underway, they were the last new class of passenger steam locomotives in France.

History

A prototype 4-8-2 four cylinder compound locomotive, the 241.C.1, had been built by Schneider et Cie. in 1930 for the former Chemins de fer de Paris à Lyon et à la Méditerranée (PLM). This locomotive was utilised as the basis for the new class, but with some key design changes including the addition of an automatic stoker, strengthened frames, and boiler modifications.

Production
35 locomotives were built by Schneider et Cie., of Le Creusot between 1948 and 1952.

Service life
The class was initially assigned to the line between Paris and Marseilles, hauling services including the famous Le Mistral expresses, but within a few years they were displaced by electrification. Most of the class was then transferred to the Nord, l'Est and l'Ouest regions. For over ten years they managed the traffic on the line west of Le Mans, including the  line to Brest and  line to Quimper. They hauled trains of up to 16 coaches, weighing over 800 tons.

The 241.P class were allocated to the following depots: 
 South-eastern Region: Dijon, Marseille-Blancarde, Lyon-Mouche, Nevers
 Eastern Region: la Villette, Noisy-le-Sec, Chaumont
 Northern Region: La Chapelle (Gare du Nord)
 Western Region: Le Mans

Although powerful, the class was not without its problems. The frames, lightly constructed to avoid excessive axle load, were not able to handle the power of the cylinders and flexing of the frame under load led to problems such as hot axle boxes. The class also suffered from leaking boiler tubes after passing over points, which necessitated structural reinforcement.

The class was withdrawn progressively from service from 1965 for 241.P.1 to 1973 for 241.P.16. Their last regular work, on the Le Mans to Nantes route, ended in early 1970. The class was nicknamed the grosses P to distinguish them from the 141.P Class, which were called the petites P.

Preservation

Four 241.Ps have been preserved: 
 241.P.9, withdrawn in 1973 and placed in storage in Guîtres, was transferred from Bordeaux to Toulouse on 7 December 2008 and is the subject of a restoration project by AAATV-MP
 241.P.16, withdrawn in 1973, is on display at the Cité du train (National Railway Museum of France) in Mulhouse
 241.P.17, preserved at Le Creusot and restored to working operation in April 2006, is authorised to run on SNCF tracks, after a 13-year restoration project. It is classed as a Monument historique
 241.P.30, withdrawn in 1969 and transferred to the French-Swiss border town of Vallorbe for public display, was transferred again in 1997 to Saint-Sulpice, Neuchâtel, Switzerland, and into the care of the Vapeur Val-de-Travers group for static preservation In 2019 the locomotive was acquired by AJECTA and transported to Longueville.

References

241P
4-8-2 locomotives
Schneider locomotives
Steam locomotives of France
Railway locomotives introduced in 1948
Standard gauge locomotives of France
2′D1′ h4v locomotives
Passenger locomotives